Nick Fletcher may refer to:
 Nick Fletcher (film editor)
 Nick Fletcher (politician)

See also
 Nicholas Fletcher, American football coach